James Gillespie Barclay (24 June 1882 – 5 October 1972) was a New Zealand politician of the Labour Party.

Biography

Early life
Barclay was born in Pigeon Bay on Banks Peninsula. His father was Morrison Barclay. He married Helen Betrice in 1907, but was a widower by the time he joined the army. Before World War I, he was a farmer and lived in the Christchurch suburb of Riccarton. He served with the New Zealand Expeditionary Force from 1916 to 1919. He then bought a property in Pukehuia, Northland, where he owned  near the Wairoa River. He sold his farm in 1931 and retired to Whangarei. He served on several local boards in Northland.

Political career

He was a cabinet minister in the First Labour Government under Peter Fraser. He was Minister of Agriculture (1941–1943), Minister of Marketing (1941–1943), Minister of Lands (1943), and Commissioner of State Forests (1943).

He then became High Commissioner to Australia from 1944 to 1950. His appointment (and that of the other defeated candidate Charles Boswell) attracted criticism as political appointments.

Later life

James Barclay died in Christchurch in 1972.

Notes

References

External links
Portrait photo published in The New Zealand Herald in 1931
 

1882 births
1972 deaths
New Zealand Labour Party MPs
Members of the Cabinet of New Zealand
High Commissioners of New Zealand to Australia
New Zealand MPs for North Island electorates
Members of the New Zealand House of Representatives
Unsuccessful candidates in the 1928 New Zealand general election
Unsuccessful candidates in the 1931 New Zealand general election
Unsuccessful candidates in the 1943 New Zealand general election
Unsuccessful candidates in the 1951 New Zealand general election